The CTBC Financial Park, or Chinatrust Commercial Bank Headquarters, is a skyscraper office complex located in Nangang District, Taipei, Taiwan. Construction of the complex began in 2010 and it was completed in 2013. It houses the headquarters of CTBC Financial Holding and is situated in close proximity to Nangang Software Park and Taipei Nangang Exhibition Center.

Design
The building was designed jointly by the American architectural team NBBJ and the Taiwanese team Fei & Cheng Associates. The design adopts the concept of traditional Taiwanese residential courtyard buildings to modern high-rise buildings that combines tradition and modernity, and expresses three buildings connected by air bridges in a shape like the Chinese character for "mountain".
LED lights are used in the office space, lighting and air conditioning can be switched on and off in small areas, and electronic ballasts are planned to save electricity expenditure. The elevator power interruption adopts the emergency power supply automatic switching operation function. The water facilities in the building, including fountains and sprinklers around the park, all adopt rainwater recovery equipment, recycling systems and water-saving equipment. To cope with extreme weather, a detention pond with a water storage capacity of 2,000 tonnes is installed in the basement of the headquarters to effectively avoid flooding in case of heavy rain. The complex received the MIPIM Asia 2015 Silver Award for Best Mixed-Use Development.

Gallery

See also 
 List of tallest buildings in Taiwan
 List of tallest buildings in Taipei
 CTBC Taichung Headquarters
 CTBC Financial Holding

References

2013 establishments in Taiwan
Skyscraper office buildings in Taipei
Office buildings completed in 2013
Shopping malls in Taipei
Bank headquarters in Taiwan